The Paul L. Vinson House is a historic house located in Sebring, Florida. It is locally significant as a rare, highly distinctive example of Mission Revival style architecture.

Description and history 
The two-story Mission Revival style house was completed in 1920. It was originally built for Paul L. Vinson, a local plumbing contractor. It was added to the National Register of Historic Places on August 14, 1989.

References

External links
 Highlands County listings at National Register of Historic Places
 Highlands County listings at Florida's Office of Cultural and Historical Programs

Houses in Highlands County, Florida
Houses on the National Register of Historic Places in Florida
Mission Revival architecture in Florida
Buildings and structures in Sebring, Florida
National Register of Historic Places in Highlands County, Florida
Houses completed in 1920
1920 establishments in Florida